Augusto Gansser-Biaggi (28 October 1910 – 9 January 2012) was a Swiss geologist who specialised in the geology of the Himalayas. He was born in Milan.

Career
His geological researches were global in scope:
 East Greenland (1934), a 4-month expedition under Lauge Koch.
 Himalaya (1936), an 8-month expedition under Arnold Heim.
 Colombia (1937–1945, for Shell)
 Trinidad (1947–1950, for Shell)
 Iran (1951–1958, chief geologist of the National Iranian Oil Company)

He got the Tibetan variant of malaria at the First Swiss Himalaya Expedition, and thereafter a lifelong resistance. He circumambulated Mount Kailash disguised as a pilgrim, discovering at the foot of the mountain the origin of one rock seen in the Indian part of the Himalayas and a sensation: seafloor rocks on its South side (ophiolites). Later on, he interpreted this Indus-Yarlung-Tsangpo Suture Zone (ISZ) as the border between the Indian and the Eurasian Plate.

Iran: using his field notes and relief pictures taken by the Iranian Air Force, he chose a 50x 12 km area. Four drillings were not able to go through a huge salt and gypsum layer. Only Number 5 was successful, the largest known 'wildcat' oil gusher, North of Qom (Iran) on 26 August 1956 (3,000 m deep, 80,000 tons oil/day). The gas got lighted up on 13 September, sometime later the well closed itself.

From 1958 until 1977, he was professor of Geology at the University and the Swiss Federal Institute of Technology in Zurich, from where he carried out several researches in the Himalayas (Nepal, India and Bhutan). There were five expeditions between 1963 and 1977 to Bhutan. In 1980 and 1985 he was invited by Deng Xiao Ping to Tibet.

Notes: the Greenland expedition included Professor Eugen Wegmann (University of Neuchâtel), Swiss geologists René Masson and Eduard Wenk. The Bhutan expeditions were possible with the help of Jigme Dorje Wangchuks, King of Bhutan and his adviser Fritz von Schulthess.

Family
After the first Himalayan expedition he married Linda Biaggi (Toti) from Lugano. The family has two sons and four daughters: Ursula (1941), Mario (1943), Luca (1945), Manuela (1949), Francesca (1956), Rosanna (1959). He named Pico Toti, Sierra Nevada del Cocuy (Colombia) after his wife following their joint first ascent. She died in 2000 (Alzheimer's disease). Gansser-Biaggi turned 100 on 28 October 2010.

Awards
 Patron's Medal of the Royal Geographical Society in London for the book: “The Geology of the Himalayas“
 Wollaston Medal (the highest award granted by the Geological Society of London).
 Prix Gaudry (the highest award granted by the French Geological Society)
 Gustav-Steinmann-Medaille of the Geological Society of West Germany
 King Albert Medal of Merit for his mountain research
 In 1983 the University of Peshawar in Pakistan gave him the title of "Baba Himalaya" (Father of the Himalayas).
 in 2005 he became honorary member of the Nepal Geological Society.

Publications 
  It gratefully acknowledges Sven Hedin's literature about the Himalayas.
 
 
 
 
 
 
 
 
  Note: It is about the Guyana Shield, the Tepuys and Mount Roraima.

References

Further reading 
 Note: based on Linda Biaggi-Gansser's notes.
 

1910 births
2012 deaths
Wollaston Medal winners
20th-century Swiss geologists
Swiss centenarians
Men centenarians
Gustav-Steinmann-Medaille winners
Foreign associates of the National Academy of Sciences
Italian emigrants to Switzerland